Chariklou (also Romanized as Charīklū; also known as Chirīklu) is a village in Qeshlaqat-e Afshar Rural District, Afshar District, Khodabandeh County, Zanjan Province, Iran. At the 2006 census, its population was 85, in 21 families.

References 

Populated places in Khodabandeh County